Edwina Garcia (born December 8, 1944) is an American politician in the state of Minnesota.

Garcia was born in Clovis, New Mexico. She went to University of Minnesota. Garcia served on the Richfield, Minnesota City Council. She served in the Minnesota House of Representatives.

References

1944 births
Living people
Women state legislators in Minnesota
Minnesota city council members
Democratic Party members of the Minnesota House of Representatives
People from Clovis, New Mexico
People from Richfield, Minnesota
University of Minnesota alumni
Women city councillors in Minnesota
21st-century American women